Robetta may refer to:

Cristofano Robetta (1462–1535), an Italian artist, goldsmith, and engraver
Rosetta@home#Robetta, an automated protein structure prediction service